The Pleasant Historic District, Chopawamsic RDA Camp 4 near Triangle, Virginia dates from 1934. It was listed on the National Register of Historic Places in 1989. It includes NPS rustic architecture and is within what is now Prince William Forest Park.

References

National Register of Historic Places in Prince William County, Virginia
Buildings and structures completed in 1934
Historic districts in Prince William County, Virginia
Historic districts on the National Register of Historic Places in Virginia
Prince William Forest Park
1934 establishments in Virginia
National Park Service rustic in Virginia